Cyperus capitatus is a species of sedge that is native to northern parts of Africa and southern parts of Europe.

It was first formally described by Domenico Vandelli in 1771.

See also 
 List of Cyperus species

References 

capitatus
Plants described in 1771
Flora of France
Flora of North Africa
Flora of Southeastern Europe
Flora of Southwestern Europe
Flora of Western Asia
Taxa named by Domenico Vandelli